Betelhem Dessie (Amharic: ቤተልሔም ደሴ; born 1999) is an Ethiopian web and mobile technologies developer. She owns four patented projects individually and an additional three in collaboration. Betelhem has been named "the youngest pioneer in Ethiopia's fast emerging tech scene" by CNN.

Early life 
Betelhem was born and raised in Harar, Ethiopia. Betelhem's career started at the age of nine. She notes that her father has been one of the biggest supporters of her ambition. Betelhem was able to become familiar with computers by using her father's computer at his electronic shop. In her interview with the Ethiopian digital news platform Addis Insight, Betelhem tells a story of how she asked her father for money to celebrate her 9th birthday. Her father replied that he did not have money because he was busy with work. In response, Betelhem decided to work in his electronic shop and make the money herself. She made 1600 Ethiopian birr by sending customers audio and video files. After this incident, her interest in computers gained momentum. She improved her skills in video-editing, computer maintenance, and installing cellphone software. By the age of ten, Betelhem had started coding in HTML by herself. Alongside her regular school work, she taught basic computer skills to her classmates from school.

Career 
Betelhem Dessie got government recognition for her work in her community at an early age. Consequently, she was interviewed by multiple local and national media platforms. After moving from Harar to Addis Ababa with her parents, Betelhem was employed as a developer for the government at the age of twelve by the Ethiopian Information Network Security Agency (INSA) from 2011 to 2012.

It trains children aged six to thirteen on topics ranging from robotics and AI to programming. She works with more than eighty young people to find solutions to society's problems using technology. She has also trained forty girls from Girls Can Code, a United States Embassy project. She has stressed the lack of female role models in technology saying, "Unless you really are in the industry, there is no one to look up to in technology." Among previous software programming  projects attributed to her is an application that maps irrigation projects in Ethiopia. It was developed for use in government.

In 2018, Betelhem was a third year Software Engineering student at Addis Ababa University. She was recently named one of the young African innovators to watch in 2019 by Quartz Africa.

References 

Ethiopian women computer scientists
1999 births
Living people
People from Harari Region